The Magnolia Purewater Wizards was the final name of a basketball franchise owned by San Miguel Corporation (SMC) that played in the Philippine Basketball League from 1983 to 2010. It played under various brand names owned by SMC - Lagerlite (1985), Magnolia Ice Cream (1983-1984, 1986-1992, 2004-2007), Instafood (1993-1994), Magnolia Cheezee Spread (1995-1996), Wilkins (1998), Viva (2004), Magnolia Beverage (2007), San Mig Coffee (2007-2008) and Magnolia PureWater (2008-2009).

Current roster

Notable coaches
 Derrick Pumaren (1983-1990)
 Franz Pumaren (1991-1992)
 Francis Rodriguez (1993-1994)
 Jong Uichico (1994-1996)
 Arlene Rodriguez (1998)
 Koy Banal (2004–2009)

External links
 Magnolia Purewater PBL website

Former Philippine Basketball League teams
San Miguel Corporation
1983 establishments in the Philippines
Basketball teams established in 1983